Édouard "Edy" Schmit (born 23 December 1930) is a Luxembourgian épée fencer. He competed at the 1956 and 1960 Summer Olympics. In 2008 he was promoted to the rank of Chevalier in the Order of Merit of the Grand Duchy of Luxembourg.

References

External links
 

1930 births
Possibly living people
Luxembourgian male épée fencers
Olympic fencers of Luxembourg
Fencers at the 1956 Summer Olympics
Fencers at the 1960 Summer Olympics
Sportspeople from Luxembourg City
Knights of the Order of Merit of the Grand Duchy of Luxembourg